The 1914 Wyoming gubernatorial election took place on November 3, 1914. The Democratic nominee and cattleman John B. Kendrick defeated the Republican Hilliard S. Ridgely with 51.61% of the vote.

Results

Results by county

References

1914 Wyoming elections
1914
Wyoming